Music of The Bahamas is a docu-musical adapted from E. Clement Bethel's master's thesis in ethnomusicology. It written by Nicolette Bethel and Philip A. Burrows, and directed by Philip A. Burrows.

It was first performed in 1991 for the Edinburgh Festival Fringe, and again in 1992 during the Quincentennial Season of the Dundas Repertory Company. It was revived in 2002 by Ringplay Productions.

External links
 Music of The Bahamas

Bahamian music